The Weald  is an intermittently wooded area between and east of the North and South Downs in Sussex, Kent and Surrey, South East England. It once had a nationally important iron industry.

Weald may also refer to:

Places in England
Lower Weald, Middle Weald and Upper Weald, hamlets in Calverton, Buckinghamshire
Wealden District, East Sussex

Harrow Weald, London, a suburb
Weald, Oxfordshire, a village

Essex
North Weald Bassett, a village in Essex 
South Weald in Essex
Weald Country Park, Essex

Kent
Kentish High Weald landscape area; see High Weald Landscape Trail
Sevenoaks Weald, a village also known as Weald
Weald of Kent Grammar School in Tonbridge
Weald of Kent (UK Parliament constituency), a proposed UK parliament constituency

Literature
The Weald, the fictional setting of Lois McMaster Bujold's The Hallowed Hunt

See also 

Wield, Hampshire
Wold (disambiguation)
Wealden (disambiguation)